Patricio Guzmán Lozanes (born August 11, 1941) is a Chilean documentary film director. He is most known for his films The Battle of Chile (1975-1979) and Salvador Allende (2004).

Career 
Guzmán also teaches documentary film classes in Europe and Latin America, and is the founder and director of the International Documentary Festival of Santiago (FIDOCS). He lives in France. His 1983 film The Compass Rose was entered into the 13th Moscow International Film Festival. His 2015 film The Pearl Button screened in the main competition section of the 65th Berlin International Film Festival. He received a nomination for the Writers Guild of America Award for Best Documentary Screenplay for his 2010 film Nostalgia for the Light.

Filmography 
 La Tortura y otras formas de diálogo (1968)
 El Paraíso ortopédico (1969)
 Primer año (1971)
 La Respuesta de octubre (1972)
 La Batalla de Chile: La insurrección de la burguesía (1975)
 La Batalla de Chile: El golpe de estado (1977)
 La Batalla de Chile: El poder popular (1979)
 Rosa de los vientos (1983)
 En nombre de Dios (1987)
 La Cruz del Sur (1992)
 Pueblo en vilo (1995)
 Chile, la memoria obstinada (1997)
 La Isla de Robinson Crusoe (1999)
 Invocación (2000)
 Le Cas Pinochet (2001)
 Madrid (2002)
 Salvador Allende (2004)
 Mon Jules Verne (2005) (TV)
 Nostalgia for the Light (2010)
 The Pearl Button (2015)
 The Cordillera of Dreams (La Cordillera de los sueños) (2019)
 Mi país imaginario (2022)

Awards and nominations

References

External links
Guzmán's Website 
Water Is The Connection: An Interview with Patricio Guzmán
Interview with Guzmán from The Center for Social Media at American University

1941 births
Living people
Alternative journalists
Chilean documentary film directors
Chilean film directors
European Film Awards winners (people)
Silver Bear for Best Screenplay winners